Norton Abrasives of Worcester, Massachusetts, USA is the world's largest manufacturer and supplier of abrasives for commercial applications, household, and automotive refinishing usage. 

Norton Company was founded in 1885 by a group of ceramists and entrepreneurs from Worcester, Massachusetts. The group set out to manufacture the first mass-produced, precision-made grinding wheel to fulfill the burgeoning U.S. manufacturing industry's growing need for abrasives. 

In 1990 it was purchased by Saint-Gobain of France. Norton specializes in the manufacture of abrasive products for applications in the autobody, construction, welding/industry, and marine/composite markets as well as for contractors and DIY consumers.

Origins and History 

The roots of the Norton Company begin with in a pottery shop Worcester, opened in 1858 by Franklin Norton and his older cousin Frederick Hancock. The shop specialized in redware and stoneware pottery. In 1873, an employee of the shop, Sven Pulson, invented a Grinding wheel that was superior to most on the market at that time. This new grinding wheel was made by mixing clay with emery and water. As the need for grinding wheels was expanding, Frank Norton patented Pulson's invention and began manufacturing it. By 1885, Frank Norton's discouraging health and Frederick Hancock's lack of interest in the new product resulted in the need to sell the wheel manufacturing business.

Pulson left the pottery shop in 1880, replaced by his brother-in-law John Jeppson. When Frank Norton's business came on the market, he was quick to purchase it. Partnering with co-workers, Walter Messer and Charles Allen; Worcester Polytechnic Institute professors, Milton Prince Higgins and George I. Alden; and Washburn & Moen employees Fred Harris Daniels and Horace A. Young.

The partners built a new factory on the outskirts of the city, in the Greendale neighborhood. The factory was not only important to the company for its innovation but also for its proximity to two major railways for shipping. The Greendale factory stands to this day. During the late 1890s, corporate decision-making proved conservative until it was assured the company would succeed. Until that time, dividends were frequently forgone and many of the owners declined to draw a salary.

Also pivotal to Norton's early growth was a focus on marketing. The company introduced a series of pamphlets and related literature, which detailed the intricacies of each wheel and advised users on benefits for desired applications. By the mid-1890s, Norton stocked the largest inventory of grinding wheels in the world, subsequently beginning distribution in Chicago (1887), New York City (1904), and soon after, across Europe.

One of the largest keys to the growth of the company was Norton's 1900 expansion into the machine tools industry. Through partnership with Charles H. Norton, the company founded the Norton Grinding Company division. The company specialized in the production of stationary grinding machines, an alternative to expensive workmen, which were capable of producing high volume, working with extremely heavy materials, and grinding with an unbelievable tolerance. Initially, with minimal product need, Norton's Grinding division saw little success, but the American industrial needs of World War I and the American automobile industry boom began a period of explosive growth. In 1904, Norton employee Aldus Higgins invented a water-cooled furnace, which was crucial to the company's success at the time. 

In 1914, Henry Ford's purchase of thirty-five Norton Grinders prompted Ford to remark that "the abrasive processes are basically responsible for our ability to produce cars to sell for less than a thousand dollars. Were it not for these processes these same cars would cost at least five thousand dollars, if indeed they could be made at all." With 95 percent of an automobile's moving parts requiring grinding, the automotive industry soon became Norton's biggest customer. With a resistance to grinding innovation, Norton gradually lost most of its industry market share by the mid-1950s.  

In 1931, Norton completed its first acquisition, when it purchased the Behr-Manning company of Watervliet, New York. This purchase added coated abrasives and sandpaper to Norton's line, which, going forward, would be two of Norton's more successful products. In the mid-1950s, with sales over $30 million, Behr-Manning was fully absorbed into Norton. In 1962, Norton became a publicly held company. Descendants of founders John Jeppson and Milton Higgins managed the company until the 1970s, including John Jeppson II.   

Since 2009, Norton has been a chief sponsor and abrasive supplier for both the United States Men's and Women's Olympic luge teams. Both teams competed under Norton sponsorship in the 2010 Vancouver Winter Games. 

Norton was also a leader in the design and building of grinding machines for mass production.

Products 
Norton's key areas of manufacture in the abrasives market are bonded abrasives, coated abrasives, non-woven abrasives, superabrasives, and specialty non-Abrasive products.

Environmental Record
In 1988, Norton instituted an industrial recycling plan for which it has received a number of awards. Norton's retail abrasive products are packaged with 100% recycled materials containing 25% post consumer waste.

In 2009, Saint-Gobain was recognized with an Energy Star Partner of the Year award by the U.S. EPA as well as a Global 100 Sustainable Company designation by the World Economic Forum. In day-to-day operations, a number of Saint-Gobain Abrasive plants have completed or are in the process of completing ISO 9000 quality certification and use FSC paper from managed forests.

References

Bibliography
 
 Cheape, Charles (1985). Family Firm To Modern Multinational Norton Company a New England Enterprise, Cambridge, Massachusetts, USA: Harvard University Press, LCCN 84010824.

See also 
 Indian Hill-North Village

External links
Website

Companies based in Worcester, Massachusetts
Machine tool builders
American companies established in 1858